Patriarch Joachim may refer to:

 Patriarch Joachim I of Bulgaria (r. 1234–1246)
 Patriarch Joachim I of Constantinople (r. 1498–1502 and 1504)
 Patriarch Joachim of Alexandria (r. 1486–1567, traditional dates)
 Patriarch Joachim of Moscow and All Russia (r. 1674–1690)
 Patriarch Joachim II of Constantinople (r. 1860–1863 and 1873–1878)
 Patriarch Joachim III of Constantinople (r. 1878–1884 and 1901–1912)
 Patriarch Joachim IV of Constantinople (r. 1884–1887)